The 1999 Las Vegas mayoral election took place on May 4 and June 8, 1999 to elect the mayor of Las Vegas, Nevada. The election was held concurrently with various other local elections, and was officially nonpartisan. It saw the election of Oscar Goodman. 

With no candidate winning a majority in the initial round of the election, a runoff was held between the top-two finishers.

Results

First round

Runoff

References

1999
1999 Nevada elections
1999 United States mayoral elections